Yanggao railway station  is a station on the Beijing–Baotou railway in Datong City, Shanxi.

Railway stations in Shanxi